Korean dramas (RR: Han-guk deurama), more popularly known as K-dramas, refer to television series in the Korean language that are made in South Korea.

They are popular worldwide, especially in Asia, partially due to the spread of Korean popular culture (the "Korean Wave") and their widespread availability via streaming services, which often offer subtitles in multiple languages. Many K-dramas have been translated internationally, and some of them have had a significant influence in other nations. In other countries, traditional television channels have broadcast some of the most well-known dramas. For example, Dae Jang Geum (2003) was sold in 150 countries.

Korean dramas have attracted international attention for their fashion, style, and culture. Their rise in popularity has led to a great boost to fashion lines.

Format 

A single director usually leads Korean dramas, which are often written by a single screenwriter. This often leads to each drama having distinct directing and dialogue styles. This differs from American television series, which can rely on multiple directors and writers working together.

The 19:00 to 21:00 evening time slots has usually have been reserved for daily dramas, which run every night from Monday through Friday. Dramas in these slots are in the telenovela format, rarely running over 150 episodes. Unlike American soap operas, these daily dramas are not broadcast during the daytime. Instead, the daytime schedule often includes reruns of the flagship dramas. The nighttime dailies can achieve very high ratings. During the late 2000s, for example, the weekend series First Wives' Club recorded 41.3%, according to TNS Korea, and the evening series Temptation of Wife peaked at 40.6%, according to TNS Korea.

Plots and storylines 
K-dramas have a multitude of different genre such as action dramas, historical dramas, school dramas, medical dramas, legal dramas, or even horror comedies. While most dramas contain romantic elements and deep emotional themes, some may also contain a tragedy or slice of life theme. There are various styles and tones.

The main themes of Korean television dramas are friendship, family values, and love, blending traditional Confucian with Western materialism and individualism.

However, it is an emerging trend amongst Korean dramas to showcase ongoing societal issues of Korean society, such as stigma of mental illness, gender inequality, suicide, classism, bullying, spy cameras, corruption, homophobia, or racism.

Historical 

The term sageuk refers to any Korean television or film drama that is either based on historical figures, incorporates historical events, or uses a historical backdrop. While sageuk literally translates to "historical drama", the term is typically reserved for dramas taking place throughout the course of Korean history.

Since the mid-2000s, some sageuks have achieved major success outside of Korea, in places such as the Asia-Pacific, Central Asia, Greater Middle East, Central and Eastern Europe and Latin America. Sageuks including Dae Jang Geum (Jewel in the Palace), Yi San (Lee San, Wind of the palace) and Jumong enjoyed strong ratings in countries such as Vietnam, Uzbekistan, Kazakhstan, Fiji and Iran. Jumong, which aired on IRIB (Islamic Republic of Iran Broadcasting) in 2008, had 85% viewership.

Romance 
Often centered around a love story, series set in contemporary times often focus on family ties and romantic relationships. Characters are mostly idealized with Korean male protagonists described as handsome, intelligent, rich, and in search of "one true love". This has also been a contributing factor to the popularity of Korean dramas among women.

History

Early years 
Radio broadcasting, including the broadcasting of radio dramas in Korea, began in 1927 under Japanese rule, with most programming in Japanese and around 30% in Korean. After the Korean War, radio dramas such as Cheongsilhongsil (1954) reflected the country's mood.

Television broadcasting began in 1956 with the launch of an experimental station, HLKZ-TV, which was shut down a few years later due to a fire. The first national television channel was Korean Broadcasting System (KBS), which started up in 1961. The first Korean television film was a 15-minute piece titled The Gate of Heaven (천국의 문, Cheongugui mun), on HLKZ-TV.

The first television series was aired by KBS in 1962. Their commercial competitor, Tongyang Broadcasting (TBC), had a more aggressive program policy and aired controversial dramas as well. The first historical TV series aired was Gukto manri (국토만리), directed by Kim Jae-hyeong (김재형), depicting the Goryeo era. In the 1960s, television sets were of limited availability, thus dramas could not reach a larger audience.

In the 1970s, television sets started to spread among the general population, and dramas switched from portraying dramatic historical figures to introducing national heroes like Yi Sun-shin or Sejong the Great. Contemporary series dealt with personal sufferings, such as Kim Soo-hyun's influential Stepmother (새엄마, Saeeomma), aired by MBC in 1972 and 1973. As technology and funding was limited, Korean channels could not make series in resource-heavy genres like action and science fiction; American and other foreign series were imported instead.

1980s–2010s 

The 1980s saw a change in Korean television, as color TV became available. Modern dramas tried to evoke nostalgia from urban dwellers by depicting rural life. Kim Soo-hyun's first real commercial success, Love and Ambition (사랑과 야망, Saranggwa yamang), aired on MBC in 1987 and is regarded as a milestone of Korean television, having recorded a 78% viewership. "Streets became quiet at around the airing time of the drama as 'practically everyone in the country' was at home in front of the TV", according to The Korea Times. The most outstanding classical historical series of the era is considered to be 500 Years of Joseon (조선왕조500년, Joseonwangjo 500 nyeon), a serial that ran for eight years, consisting of 11 separate series. The serial was produced by Lee Byung-hoon, who later directed one of the biggest international successes of Korean drama, Dae Jang Geum.The 1990s brought another important milestone for Korean television. As technology developed, new opportunities arose, and the beginning of the decade marked the launch of a new commercial channel; Seoul Broadcasting System (SBS), which facilitated and re-initiated a race for catching viewers' attention. The first real commercial success among Korean television series was Eyes of Dawn (여명의 눈동자, Yeomyeongui nundongja), aired in 1991 by MBC, starring Chae Shi-ra and Choi Jae-sung. The series led the viewers through turbulent times from the Japanese rule to the Korean War. New channel SBS also produced successful series, one of them being Sandglass in 1995. Sandglass was a "trendy drama", which the Korean Culture and Information Service considers an important milestone, having changed the way Korean dramas are made by introducing a new format. In this decade, the new miniseries format became widespread, with 12 to 24 episodes. This era marked the start of export for Korean dramas, setting off the Korean Wave.

The beginning years of the 2000s gave birth to famous Korean dramas and also marked the period of overseas distribution. Some popular ones are Full House, Autumn in My Heart and Winter Sonata. It marks the birth of a new genre, called "fusion sageuk", essentially changing the ways to produce historical series, with successful pieces such as Hur Jun, Damo and Dae Jang Geum.

It started to take over the popularity of conventional dramas among 10s and 20s because the shorter runtime, and often feature trendy contents which teenagers are easy to sympathize with.

2020s-present 
The late 2010s and 2020s saw newfound attention of K-dramas from international markets. Netflix had begun seeking productions from South Korea and other countries since around 2018 to expand offerings for their service with a growing international audience. These efforts came to fruition when Hwang Dong-hyuk's Squid Game drew in more than 111 million viewers within 17 days of its released in September 2021, becoming the service's most-watched program.

In the 2020s, several production companies began to produce dramas even before the first season was aired, keeping in mind the season system. The most representative series is The Penthouse: War in Life series, which gained sensational popularity as it aired over three seasons. The biggest reason why Korean dramas introduced the season system is interpreted as changes in the industry due to the 52-hour workweek, viewers' rejection of feature-length dramas, and excessive supply of dramas. At the same time, MBC and tvN's anomalous organization began to be criticized a lot. tvN extended one episode of the drama to 2 hours and 20 minutes. delaying it to the late night of another drama. In particular, the running time of the last episode of Hospital Playlist was close to three hours, but even though it was reduced after editing, it delayed the formation of the next The Road: The Tragedy of One to late night as it passed two hours. And MBC canceled telenovela The Second Husband and reran the thriller The Veil at that time.

Production 
Korean series were originally produced in-house by the television channels themselves, but have been outsourced to independent companies since the 2000s. In 2012, as much as 75% of all K-dramas were produced this way. Competition is fierce among these companies; out of 156 registered firms, only 34 of them produced dramas that were actually aired in 2012.

In the late 2010s, a typical Korean drama may cost as much as ₩700 million per episode. Historical dramas have a bigger budget; one episode of the historical romance The Red Sleeve cost as much as ₩950 million. Recently, factors such as improving the work environment, along with whether to sign contracts with domestic and foreign OTT companies such as Netflix have served as variables. For example, Kingdom had a budget of ₩2 billion per episode, while ₩3 billion were spent on each episode of Sweet Home.

Often, production companies overrun their budgets and cannot pay salaries. In 2012, actors held a demonstration in front of the headquarters of KBS, expressing their concerns. Actors are usually paid after the last episode is aired. In series made by smaller production companies, there have been cases where the companies went bankrupt and could not pay their actors and crew, while the channel denied all responsibility, claiming all liability was with the bankrupt production firm. Producer Kim Jong-hak spent ₩10 billion on Faith, which was considered a commercial failure, resulting in the inability of Kim to pay crew salaries and other overheads. Kim, who had produced iconic dramas such as Eyes of Dawn and Sandglass, committed suicide after he was accused of embezzlement.

The biggest stars may earn more than ₩200 million per episode, with Kim Soo-hyun, the lead of hit dramas Moon Embracing the Sun (2012), My Love from the Star (2013) and It's Okay to Not Be Okay (2020) reportedly receiving ₩500 million per episode for One Ordinary Day in 2021.

Filmmaking process 

As producing a series involves high expenses, production companies seek to shoot the episodes in the shortest time possible. In contrast to practices elsewhere, the first four episodes of Korean series are usually shot in advance, but the rest are shot continuously as the series is being aired. Scripts are not finished in advance, and may change according to viewer feedback and viewership ratings, where popular characters receive increased screen time and plotlines are changed to match audience expectations. These changes may occur a few hours before daily shooting, and the crew might receive only a few ready pages. The production usually works with three camera crews, who work in a rotating manner to speed up filming. Because of unregulated script changes and tight shooting schedules, actors are almost continuously on standby, and have no time to leave the set or sleep properly. The Korean media have a separate word to describe irregular, short sleeps that actors resort to, in often uncomfortable positions, or within the set: jjok-jam (쪽잠), or "side-sleeping". Dramas usually air on two days every week, with following episodes having to be shot within the intervening five days. Some Korean actors have admitted to receiving IV therapy during filming, due to extreme schedules and exhaustion. Nonetheless, the live-shoot model remains widely used since the production team can react to real time audience feedback.

Production teams originally sent two tapes to the channels; a primary copy and a backup copy. However, due to the tight filming schedules, a 70-minute episode might arrive at the broadcasting station on seven separate tapes in ten-minute installments. It happened that while the episode is being broadcast, the crew would be still shooting the last minutes or cutting the rest of the episode. During the airing of the nineteenth episode of Man from the Equator, screens countrywide went black for 10 minutes. Actor Kwon Sang-woo was openly complaining that he was still shooting King of Ambition 30 minutes before the last episode began airing. In South Korea, some production teams still do planning and scheduling manually, instead of using dedicated software.

In 2016, dramas such as Descendants of the Sun, Uncontrollably Fond, Moon Lovers: Scarlet Heart Ryeo and Hwarang: The Poet Warrior Youth were all pre-produced before airing. Nonetheless, some pre-produced episodes are often re-edited or even reshot the day of airing, due to audience feedback.

The larger broadcasting companies have their own dedicated shooting locations for historical dramas, with extensive and elaborate sets. MBC's series are shot at the Yongin Daejanggeum Park in Gyeonggi Province, while KBS dramas utilize the Mungyeongsaejae Studio (문경새재 KBS촬영장) in North Gyeongsang Province and their studio in Suwon.

Production companies 

Independent production companies are classified as follows:
 Those founded and/or owned by industry veterans (e.g. Kim Jong-hak Production, Logos Film, iWill Media)
 Owned by the broadcast companies (e.g. Studio S, Monster Union, MBC C&I, JTBC Studios)
 Owned by entertainment companies (e.g. Studio Dragon, LOTTE CULTUREWORKS, SM Life Design Group, YG STUDIOPLEX, studio&NEW, Studio Santa Claus Entertainment)
 Big-tier (e.g. Pan Entertainment, Chorokbaem Media)
 Small-tier

Crew

Actors and actresses 

In the 2000s, it became customary to cast popular K-pop idols in dramas. Initially, this generated mixed reactions. Their appearance had provoked predominantly negative reactions outside their fandom because singers and dancers acting outside of their musical circle was regarded as unprofessional. Also, some idols were criticized for poor acting. Nowadays, this has become much more common feature in Korean dramas, as the public has been getting more used to the concept of "idol actors" and some idols have become known for their excellent acting skills. Their critical reception is still mixed, however, some of them, like Bae Suzy, IU, Yim Si-wan, Seo In-guk, Ok Taec-yeon, Park Jin-young, Doh Kyung-soo and Im Yoon-ah, became successful as actors and actresses.

There were also instances of children taking up careers as child actors or actresses, usually portraying either the younger versions of some characters or the children of the adult characters from dramas. Subsequently, there were some child actors and actresses who continue pursuing acting careers even after reaching adulthood, and with some achieving success even after adulthood. Notably, such people include actors like Yoon Chan-young, Park Solomon, Yoo Seung-ho and Yeo Jin-goo; and actresses like Kim So-hyun, Lee Se-young, Nam Ji-hyun, Kim Hyang-gi, Moon Geun-young, Park Shin-hye, Kim Sae-ron and Kim Yoo-jung.

Scriptwriters and directors 
Scriptwriters and directors of Korean dramas are often as well known as actors are. An overwhelming majority of scriptwriters (90% according to the Beijing Metro Reader) are women, who not only write love stories but action series as well. Compared to Korean cinema, television is more appealing for scriptwriters as contract conditions are better, acknowledgment is greater, and the salary is higher.

Famous scriptwriters tend to have a say in their field. The most well-known scriptwriters include the Hong sisters, who wrote popular series such as My Girl, You're Beautiful and My Girlfriend Is a Gumiho; Kim Soon-ok, the screenwriter of The Penthouse: War in Life, The Last Empress, Band of Sisters, Jang Bo-ri is Here! and Temptation of Wife; Kim Eun-sook, the screenwriter of Lovers in Paris, Secret Garden, The Heirs, Descendants of the Sun and Guardian: The Lonely and Great God; Lee Kyung-hee, famous for I'm Sorry, I Love You and The Innocent Man; male writer  of Midas and Triangle; Noh Hee-kyung, the author of That Winter, the Wind Blows; and It's Okay, That's Love; and Park Ji-eun, who wrote My Husband Got a Family, My Love from the Star, The Producers, Legend of the Blue Sea and Crash Landing on You. In particular, writer Kim Soon-ok is famous for captivating male viewers who did not watch dramas well. In 2021, an article called "Kim Soon-ok, Kim Eun-sook, and Kim Eun-hee" was also published, referring to star writers.

Acknowledged TV directors include Lee Byung-hoon, who directed Hur Jun, Dae Jang Geum and Yi San; Kim Jong-hak, the director of Eyes of Dawn, Sandglass, The Legend and Faith;, the director of Full House, Worlds Within and Iris II and Jang Tae-yoo who directed War of Money, Painter of the Wind, Deep Rooted Tree , My Love from the Star and Hyena. In recent years, director Jo Hyun-tak was also propelled to fame through his works Sky Castle, which became one of the highest rated dramas in Korean cable television history, and Snowdrop, which, despite its alleged historical distortions, was ranked first among the most-watched series on Disney+ in Asian countries like Singapore and South Korea.

While scriptwriters are mostly women, directors are usually men. Some female directors have risen to prominence, such as Lee Na-jeong (이나정), who directed The Innocent Man, and Lee Yun-jeong (이윤정), whose most famous works are Coffee Prince and Heart to Heart. The latter director is also the first female television producer employed by Munhwa Broadcasting Corporation (MBC).

Music 

Music plays an important role in Korean dramas. Original soundtracks, abbreviated OST's, are explicitly made for each series, and in contrast to American series, fans have a need to buy the soundtrack album of dramas. This trend started in the 1990s, when producers swapped purely instrumental soundtracks for songs performed by popular K-pop singers. Tom Larsen, director of YA Entertainment, a distributor of Korean TV series, thinks that Korean soundtracks are polished enough musically to be considered standalone hits.

During the 2000s, it became customary for lead actors to participate in original soundtracks, also partially due to the employment of K-pop stars as actors. Actor Lee Min-ho, and leader of boy band SS501, Kim Hyun-joong both recorded songs for Boys Over Flowers, while the actors of You're Beautiful formed a fictional band and held concerts, where they perform the soundtracks live.

OST songs of popular K-dramas can also become hits on regular music charts, with good sales of both physical and digital albums. The chart performance of the OST songs usually co-relate to the popularity of the drama. Songs from the OST of Secret Garden for example, had high digital sales and high rankings on music charts. My Destiny, performed by Lyn for My Love from the Star, led music charts in Hong Kong, Taiwan, South Korea, and other Asian countries. It also won the Best OST award at the 2014 Baeksang Arts Awards. The soundtrack album of You're Beautiful sold 57,000 physical copies. Performers of OST songs for action series Iris held two concerts in Japan in front of an audience of 60,000 people.

Although the songs in Korean dramas may have only a selective few or are repetitive, the choosing of the songs are not that easy of a process. An example of this can be found in the OST for the Korean drama: Guardian: The Lonely and Great God. Songs usually are made to convey emotions or scenes especially in dramas and the emotion was assigned to be conveyed by Rocoberry was suffering and beauty. Rocoberry is a Korean indie pop duo with the members of Roco and conan and they are famous for composing songs in Korean dramas. Even though they had quite the experience with composing songs, for Guardian: The Lonely and Great God, they had to create 12 different compositions for this drama until finally one of their most famous songs I Will Go to You Like the First Snow was chosen. Not only did it take 12 compositions for this song to be chosen but after the approval of this songs, there had to be 7 rewrites until it was finally complete and met the satisfaction standards of the production team. link The song was used in only two episodes despite the hard process. The song was placed in two scenes that later on were shown to be connected to each other and also became some of the most important scenes in the drama. This is only the beginning of understanding how much time and effort goes into the choosing of songs for these types of dramas and how they can enhance a scene in many different ways.

OST composers usually look for singers who have previously had success in the genre. Songs are written to reflect the mood of the series and their structure. Sometimes performers give their own songs for a series. For example, Baek Ji-young thought her song That Man, originally written for her own album, would fit Secret Garden. There are popular OST singers who are often employed, like Baek Ji-young, Lyn, and Lee Seung-cheol. Sometimes, foreign singers are invited to perform songs for Korean OST. For instance, Swedish artist Lasse Lindh sang several songs for series like Angel Eyes, Soul Mate, I Need Romance, and Guardian: The Lonely and Great God.

Rating system 

The television rating system is regulated by the Korea Communications Commission, and was implemented in 2000. According to the system, programs, including Korean dramas, are rated according to the following principles (ratings irrelevant to dramas are omitted):
 : programs that may be inappropriate for children under 12, such as mild violence, suggestive themes or language.
 : programs that may be inappropriate for children under 15. Most dramas and talk shows are rated this way. These programs may include moderate or strong adult themes, language, sexual inference, and violence.
 : programs intended for adults only. These programs might include adult themes, sexual situations, frequent use of strong language and disturbing scenes of violence.

Reception 

According to a researcher at the University of Vienna, popularity of Korean dramas have their foundation in Confucian values they transmit, which Asian viewers can easily identify with. Respect for elders, filial piety, family-orientedness, and the display of perceived "Asian moral values" play an important role in Korean series. YA Entertainment, the American distributor of Korean dramas, believes that part of the attractiveness of these series come from the quality of camera work, scenic locations, and spectacular costumes, which make the "final product very stylish and attractive, with arguably some of the highest TV production values in the world." Korean series follow their own formula, are innovative and don't conform to Western television productions. Stephan Lee from Entertainment Weekly called Korean dramas "fascinating and weirdly comforting".

Exports of Korean series yielded 37.5 million in 2003, which was three times higher than the amount reached in 1999. According to data from Korea Creative Content Agency, in 2013 K-dramas constituted 82% of the culture content export of South Korea, with an income of $167 million, which is four times more than a decade before.

A driving force behind the rising popularity is the intense involvement of fans. Because of the live-shooting production of K-dramas, Korean-speaking fans have the opportunity to participate in their creation—a unique phenomenon in the mass media world. They can influence the content of later shows in the series through complaints and suggestions, which are frequently adopted by the production teams.

The global community of non-Korean-speaking fans, on the other hand, is more involved in the consumption aspects: Fans share their opinions through tweets and comments on newsgroups (for example, the Soompi discussion forum) as well as reviews and recaps on websites and blogs. However, the impact of their social media activity goes beyond the fan community. It spreads the word about the K-drama genre to social connections like acquaintances, friends and family (e.g. Facebook friends or followers on Twitter) and thereby generally raises its popularity. But it also has an effect on the creation of new dramas. It influences the popularity of certain dramas, leading to higher demand for those videos from streaming sites and additional income for broadcasters. When a substantial profit results, it raises not only the prestige of people involved in the production but also provides feedback for production teams and indirectly influences future productions.

International reception

East Asia

China 
In China, South Korean programs on Chinese government TV networks accounted for more than all other foreign programs combined in 2006. Hong Kong has its own channel for airing Korean dramas, TVB J2, but ATV also airs Korean series in prime-time slots. My Love from the Star received enthusiastic feedback from China. It was viewed 40 billion times on numerous Chinese video sites. The drama also spurred interest about Korea, shown by China's increased consumption of Korean products such as Chi Maek (chicken and beer) and Korean cosmetics. Due to the success of Korean dramas in China, some dramas have been compiled to create feature-length films by combining all episodes into one film. The prodigious popularity of Korean dramas in the country has, on some occasions, been caught in the crossfire over diplomatic issues between China and South Korea. Most notable being the THAAD deployment in South Korea which resulted in the blocking of Korean dramas on streaming services across the country in late February 2017. Following the block, Chinese TV shows showcasing Chinese culture and other similar content replaced Korean content on TV networks' prime time schedules in the country. In November 2017, the ban was lifted unannounced following the appearance of Kpop groups on national TV and the move to resume importation of Korean dramas by Chinese streaming services. In China, apps like IQiyi, which is currently also available in Malaysia, Singapore, Taiwan and some other countries in multiple different subtitles, are available to stream and download Korean dramas for viewing.

Japan 
The first Korean drama to gain widespread popularity in Japan was Winter Sonata, which was broadcast on the NHK satellite channel NHK BS2 in 2003. The program was aired twice in the same year due to high demand from viewers. NHK also hosted a classical concert featuring Winter Sonata'''s tunes performed by Korean musicians. Korean dramas boost tourism between Korea and Japan, and is considered a possible way of improving strained relationships between the two countries, as series have become increasingly popular with Japanese viewers. Conversely, the series Iris had several pivotal scenes shot in Akita, Japan, which led to an increase of Korean tourists in that part of Japan.

 Mongolia 
In Mongolia, Korean dramas have become popular and are broadcast at prime time. Dae Jang Geum achieved success in the country and was broadcast five times due to this. Autumn in My Heart, Winter Sonata and Stairway to Heaven were other popular dramas. Popularity in Korean dramas has resulted in interest in the learning of the Korean language as well as Mongolians travelling to South Korea. It has also led to increased mutually cooperative relations between Mongolia and South Korea.

 North Korea 
Watching films or TV dramas from South Korea is a serious offence in North Korea, punishable by execution, but people still manage to acquire them on CDs and DVDs.

In 2021, there was an article that young people who were watching the popular drama The Penthouse: War in Life were caught in Pyeongseong, Pyeongnam Province, and will have to serve more than 10 years. Later, the residents of Yanggang Province began to imitate the famous lines from the Penthouse series, and the residents were also unable to avoid punishment.

 Taiwan 
In Taiwan, interest in Korean dramas began when Star in My Heart aired in 1999. Since then Korean dramas have become very popular and according to the South Korean mission 120 K-dramas had been broadcast in Taiwan in the first half of 2011.

 Southeast Asia 

 Brunei 
In recent times Korean dramas have experienced growing popularity in Brunei. The growing impact of Korean culture in Brunei led to the hosting of the ninth Korea Forum in the country at Universiti Brunei Darussalam in 2010. Korean television dramas, movies, music, and clothing have had a great impact on the people of Brunei.

 Cambodia 
The first Korean drama to be broadcast in Cambodia was Winter Sonata; it was, however, Full House that launched the interest in Korean dramas and entertainment in the country. Following the success of Full House, more Korean dramas have been dubbed into the Khmer language. Korean dramas have become popular particularly amongst youth in Cambodia.

 Indonesia 
In Indonesia, Korean dramas have gained popularity and the popular Korean dramas Winter Sonata and Endless Love were aired on Surya Citra Media in 2002. Some Korean dramas have also been remade into Indonesian versions such as Demi Cinta in 2005 which was a remake of the popular drama Autumn in My Heart and Cinta Sejati, a remake of Stairway to Heaven. RCTI and Indosiar are examples of Indonesian television networks that air Korean dramas in the early times, but later Trans TV airing some of popular Korean dramas until today.

 Laos 
The popularity of Korean dramas and pop culture in Laos has led to many Laotian tourists travelling to South Korea. Korean pop culture has gained popularity in Laos through the Thai TV channels broadcasting Korean dramas and K-pop bands in the country.

 Malaysia 
In Malaysia, Winter Sonata began airing on TV3 in 2003, which started an interest in Korean pop culture in the country. Dae Jang Geum and Autumn In My Heart were also aired in Malaysia. The popularity of Korean dramas have resulted in a positive reception of Korean expatriates in Malaysia.

 Myanmar 
In Myanmar, the K-drama Autumn in My Heart was broadcast in the country in 2001, which led to interest in Korean entertainment. When Dae Jang Geum was on air, the drama sparked an interest in Korean cuisine in the country. The rising popularity of Korean dramas and music in Myanmar has led to the Korea Foundation for International Culture Exchange (KOFICE) distributing Korean dramas in the country for free.

 Philippines 
In the Philippines, Korean dramas are politically popular on free-to-air television since 2003. In the past two decades, GMA Network has the highest number of Korean dramas broadcast in the Philippines.

 Singapore 

In Singapore, Prime 12 (now known as Suria) originally aired the Korean drama Sandglass on a weekly basis in 1996 and aired Asphalt Man in 1997. Since 2001, they are shown on Chinese language channel MediaCorp Channel U daily. The launch of KBS World, ONE TV ASIA, Oh!K, Channel M and streaming app, Viu in Singapore allows viewers to watch Korean dramas with a variety of subtitles in a matter of hours after the original South Korean telecast. Currently, Singaporeans also get access to Korean dramas through China-originated online platform IQIYI, which first soft-launched its app in 2019 and planned to expand its international bases in Singapore.

 Thailand 
When Dae Jang Geum was on air in Thailand, Korean food started gaining wide popularity. Due to the lop-sided nature of entertainment exports favoring South Korea, the Thai government requested increased introduction of popular Thai films to South Korean media outlets. This led to the signing of an Agreement of Cultural Cooperation between the two countries in August 2004.

 Vietnam 
Korean dramas have also gained popularity in Vietnam, particularly among women and young people. The fashion and hairstyles presented in Korean dramas have become very popular among the youth of the country.

 South Asia 
 Bangladesh 
Korean dramas have gained popularity in Bangladesh in recent years. Their rising popularity in the country has led to the Korea Foundation for International Culture Exchange (KOFICE), an organisation which aims to distribute Korean dramas for free to countries, cooperating with broadcasters to distribute Korean dramas for free in the country. With the growing number of K-drama fans in Bangladesh, more and more Facebook groups are popping up, giving them a platform to share their love of the shows with fellow K-drama enthusiasts and take part in events and activities hosted by the groups. One of the largest Bangladeshi K-Drama groups, BD K-Family, arranges a yearly get together for its members. Other popular Facebook K-Drama groups include K-Drama Archive BD, Korean Lovers Bangladesh, and BD Korean Drama Fam- all of which create opportunities for both local and international fans to participate in discussions about their favourite shows.

 Bhutan 
In the Himalayan kingdom of Bhutan, Korean dramas and entertainment have gained popularity particularly amongst youth. Prior to interest in Korean entertainment, Bollywood had largely been the most popular form of entertainment in the country. When the Bhutanese film industry launched in the mid-1990s, Bollywood was the only form of influence on the industry. However, in recent years Korean entertainment has made significant inroads in the country and influence the entertainment industry alongside Bollywood. Korean entertainment has managed to influence fashion, and many video shops now sell Korean dramas and movies alongside Bollywood films. The interest in Korean entertainment has also led to controversy with older generations voicing their concern that Korean entertainment will deteriorate Bhutanese culture and traditions.

 India 
In India, after the late 1990s and around 2000 Korean dramas started becoming popular through piracy particularly in north-eastern states such as Manipur, Assam, Meghalaya, Sikkim, Arunachal Pradesh, Tripura, Mizoram and Nagaland as well as parts of eastern state like West Bengal and more recently in southern states like Kerala, Telangana, Tamil Nadu. Hindi films and TV serials were banned in Manipur in 2000, as a result local television stations began broadcasting subtitled Korean dramas instead from Arirang TV and KBS World. Many young people in north-eastern, eastern, northern and southern parts of India mimic the hairstyles, clothes of Korean actors while Korean fashion became very popular in the region. As part of cultural exchange, public broadcaster Doordarshan telecast Emperor of the Sea and Dae Jang Geum. Korean dramas are dubbed in Tamil on Puthuyugam TV such as 'Boys over flowers', 'My love from another star', 'Playful Kiss' and many more. Full House and Hwang Jini started airing on Firangi channel in 2008. Reliance Big TV offered KBS World to its subscribers from 2009 on satellite television. Local fan clubs got help from Consul-General of the Republic of Korea while Korean Cultural Centre in India (KCCI) under South Korean embassy started mapping popularity of K-dramas. As per KCCI, the motivation to understand Korean drama properly without subtitles is driving the uptake of Korean language classes among the youth with females outnumbering males. DD Bharati broadcast period drama Hur Jun in 2014 that received highest viewer ratings of 34 million from January to October 2014. Online streaming platform ZEE5 launched Descendants of the Sun to test the Indian market from 8 February to 1 March 2017 and found overwhelming positive response for Korean content with viewership ran close to 56 million. The telecast of Korean drama on Cable TV in 2017 stopped as Korean Broadcasting System Network wanted to raise syndication charges due to accumulation of large viewer-ship base in India that included pockets of Bihar, Kerala and Uttar Pradesh due to short 16 to 20 episodes format that are easier for binge-watching. With increasing interest in Korean content among younger generation from tier-1 cities, Samsung through its My Galaxy mobile application is partnering with Korean Broadcasting System (KBS) in 2019 to bring exclusive content for 20 million Indian users. With COVID-19 pandemic, Dish TV started premium K-dramas dubbed in Hindi and Tamil. Korean dramas are also driving highest viewer-ship on Netflix with second season of TV series Kingdom attained the Top 10 series row as of March 2020. It's Okay to Not Be Okay is on Netflix Top 10 list in India for several weeks in August 2020 which has jumped to number 3 position. Netflix is increasing investment on Korean content to capture the Indian market. Over-the-top media service (OTT) MX Player confirmed rising popularity and demand of Korean dramas among millennial population especially the women audience and is now making deals with South Korean television and radio network company Seoul Broadcasting System (SBS) to bring more content in India. Korean dramas and films became most visited category for ShortsTV in India. As per media experts, the relatable themes in Korean content is fast catching the imagination of general public of almost every age group that is going mainstream and driving highest viewing especially after 92nd Academy Awards winning movie Parasite due to the shared Asian cultural heritage and societal values. As per Parrot Analytics report, k-drama series 'Crash Landing on You', is on demand 1.2 times than an average TV series that is 89.8% more than all drama titles shown in India forcing broadcasters to make extra slots as women are at the forefront of consumer demand in Korean content category. The COVID-19 lockdown in India proved to be an inflection point in 2020–2021 when Korean drama moved from a niche sub-culture segment to mainstream due to services like Netflix, Rakuten Viki and YouTube. It penetrated to every age group and social background. The popularity of Korean drama forced many over-the-top media service in India such as MX Player, Viu and ZEE5 to bring the dubbed versions in local language that will help cater to large non English speaking audience.

 Nepal 
Interest for Korean dramas in the Nepal began when Winter Sonata aired on Kantipur Television Network in the mid-2000s. This led to the popularity of other K-dramas such as Boys Over Flowers, Autumn In My Heart, You Are Beautiful and Full House to name a few. Popularity of Korean media products has also led to interest of learning the Korean language and has resulted in the emergence of Korean language tutorials that air on ABC Television in the country. Korean dramas have become popular among Nepali youth and markets are often frequented by teenagers looking to buy the latest dramas. The hairstyles and fashion of Korean actors have influenced the fashion sense of Nepali youth. Fascinated by the lifestyle and food of Korea, restaurants serving Korean cuisine have also been established in the country.

 Sri Lanka 
In Sri Lanka, the Independent Television Network aired Full House in 2009 and it proved popular. Dae Jang Geum aired on Rupavahini in 2012 and was dubbed in Sinhala under the title Sujatha Diyani (සුජාත දියණී), meaning "The Pure, Valuable Daughter" and received a viewer rate of over 90%. The Independent Television Network, Rupavahini, TV Derana, Sirasa TV, Swarnavahini and TV1 air Korean dramas dubbed in the Sinhalese language. Streaming service, Iflix also streams many Korean dramas with English and Sinhalese subtitles in the country, some as early as 24 hours after their original Korean broadcast. Additionally, the popularity of Korean pop culture in the country has led to an increasingly warm reception towards Korean people.

 Middle East and North Africa 
Since the mid-2000s, Israel, Iran, Morocco and Egypt have become major consumers of Korean culture. Following the success of Korean dramas in the Middle East & North Africa, the Korean Overseas Information Service made Winter Sonata available with Arabic subtitles on several state-run Egyptian television networks. According to Youna Kim (2007), "The broadcast was part of the government's efforts to improve the image of South Korea in the Middle East, where there is little understanding and exposure towards Korean culture" (p. 31). The New York Times reported that the intent behind this was to contribute towards positive relations between Arab & Berber audiences and South Korean soldiers stationed in northern Iraq.

MBC4 (Middle East Broadcasting Channel) played a major role in increasing the Korean wave's popularity in the MENA region (Middle East and North Africa). This broadcasting channel hosted a series of Korean drama , paying for the Arabic subtitles or dubbed. starting 2012 such as "Boys Over Flowers" (أيام الزهور), "You're Beautiful" (أنت جميلة), "Dream High" (حلم الشباب ), "Coffee Prince" ( مقهى الأمير). Some Arab countries opposed Korean content (dramas, reality show) out of fear that their youth would abandon Islamic traditions in order to adopt Western modernity. However, this did not stop the Korean industries from exporting more Korean Dramas to the Arab world in the following years such as "The Heirs" ( الورثة). The popularity of Korean dramas in the MENA region-and its continuous growth- originates from the content of these dramas. As the majority of the plots of Korean dramas focus on social issues (love between different social classes or family problems for instance), the Arab audiences fit themselves and could relate to the Korean socio-cultural values as they seem appealing to them. So Korean dramas play the role of an equilibrium point where two, somehow, different cultures could create a new cultural space where these two different cultures could meet.

LBC SAT and Rotana Drama (Rotana Group) played a major role in increasing the Korean wave's popularity in the MENA region (Middle East and North Africa). This broadcasting channel hosted a series of Korean drama, paying for the Arabic subtitles. starting 2022 such as "When I Was the Most Beautiful", "Extraordinary You", "Find Me in Your Memory", "Love in Sadness", "The Red Sleeve", "My Secret Terrius" the Arab audiences fit themselves and could relate to the Korean socio-cultural values as they seem appealing to them. So Korean dramas play the role of an equilibrium point where two, somehow, different cultures could create a new cultural space where these two cultures could meet.fear that the learning rituals embedded in the show would lead Kuwaiti youth to abandon their traditions wholesale in order to adopt Western morality wholesale. However, this did not stop the Korean industries from exporting more Korean Dramas to the Arab world in the following years such as.

 Iran 
Iran's state broadcaster, Islamic Republic of Iran Broadcasting (IRIB), aired several Korean dramas during prime time slots in recent years, with this decision attributed by some to their Confucian values of respect for others, which are "closely aligned to Islamic culture", while in contrast, Western productions often fail to satisfy the criteria set by Iran's Ministry of Culture and Islamic Guidance. In October 2012, the Tehran Times reported that IRIB representatives visited South Korea to visit filming locations in an effort to strengthen "cultural affinities" between the two countries and to seek avenues for further cooperation between KBS and IRIB. According to Reuters, until recently audiences in Iran have had little choice in broadcast material and thus programs that are aired by IRIB often attain higher viewership ratings in Iran than in South Korea; for example, the most popular episodes of Jumong attracted over 90% of Iranian audience (compared to 40% in South Korea), propelling its lead actor Song Il-gook to superstar status in Iran.

 Iraq 
In the early 2000s, Korean dramas were aired for South Korean troops stationed in northern Iraq as part of coalition forces led by the United States during the Iraq War. With the end of the war and the subsequent withdrawal of South Korean military personnel from the country, efforts were made to expand availability of K-dramas to the ordinary citizens of Iraq. In 2012, the Korean drama Hur Jun reportedly attained a viewership of over 90% in the Kurdistan region of Iraq. Its lead actor Jun Kwang-ryul was invited by the federal government of Iraq to visit the city of Sulaymaniyah in Kurdistan, at the special request of the country's First Lady, Hero Ibrahim Ahmed.

 Egypt Autumn in My Heart, one of the earliest Korean dramas brought over to the Middle East, was made available for viewing after five months of "persistent negotiations" between the South Korean embassy and an Egyptian state-run broadcasting company. Shortly after the series ended, the embassy reported that it had received over 400 phone calls and love letters from fans from all over the country. According to the secretary of the South Korean embassy in Cairo Lee Ki-seok, Korea's involvement in the Iraq War had significantly undermined its reputation among Egyptians, but the screening of Autumn in My Heart proved "extremely effective" in reversing negative attitudes.

 Europe 

 Romania 
The first Korean drama in Romania was aired on TVR in August 2009 with Dae Jang Geum, and in the following month it became the third most popular television program in the country. Since then, Korean dramas have seen high ratings and further success.

 North America 

 United States 
The Asian American-targeted cable TV channels AZN Television and ImaginAsian aired Korean dramas alongside content from China, Japan, India, Thailand and other parts of Asia. The dramas were aimed at the Asian American community before the channels dissolved in 2008 and 2011 respectively.

In November 2008, Netflix began offering several Korean dramas as part of its video selection. In August 2009, DramaFever began offering free subtitled video streaming service, with video advertisements, in the United States.

Singapore-based Viki streams popular Korean dramas across the world including North America, with subtitles in 70 languages. Companies in Asia have also designed streaming services available online and as mobile apps targeted towards overseas Asian communities. "MobiTV" created by the Sri Lankan company, Bhasha is a streaming service and mobile app aimed at the Sri Lankan community and streams Korean dramas dubbed in the Sinhalese language alongside other content aired in Sri Lanka. "Roopa", created by the same company, is another service available as a mobile app also aimed at the Sri Lankan community, it too streams Korean dramas dubbed in the Sinhalese language. Chinese company PPTV is another example, a mobile app, "PPTV网络电视HD" streams Korean dramas aimed at the Chinese community alongside content that is primarily available in Mandarin, Cantonese and Korean but also increasingly in English.

Additionally, Korean dramas are available at online DVD retailers. Some Korean dramas, however, are not available for region 1 (North America) encoding and NTSC video format. Amazon offers streaming of Winter Sonata for a fee.

KBFD-DT in Honolulu, Hawaii broadcasts a majority of Korean dramas on its daily schedule, as well as offering the programs on sale at its website and on demand through its K-Life channel on Oceanic Time Warner Cable. Another Honolulu outlet, KHII-TV devotes three hours of its Sunday afternoon schedule to Korean dramas.

KTSF, a channel aimed at the Asian American community in San Francisco, California airs Korean dramas as part of its schedule alongside content in Mandarin, Tagalog, Hindi, Korean, Vietnamese, Japanese, Taiwanese and Cantonese.

 South America 
Between 2001 and 2002, South America began to absorb Korean programming. The 1997 series Star in My Heart began its successful broadcast in Chile, Peru and other countries in the area, but these last two were where More had repercussions, including an Ahn Jae-wook fan club founded. In 2002, Winter Sonata, produced by KBS 2TV, became the first series in the region to match the success of Meteor Garden, attracting a cult following in Asia. Marketing sales, including DVD sets and novels, exceeded $3.5 million in Japan. In 2004, then-Japanese Prime Minister Junichiro Koizumi noted that the series' male lead was "more popular than I am in Japan." Other Korean dramas released in later years such as Jewel in the Palace (2003) and Full House (2004) had comparable levels of success.

 Chile 

Ratings and viewership 
Viewership ratings are provided by two companies in South Korea: Nielsen Korea and TNmS. Originally, Media Service Korea (MSK) was the sole company providing TV viewership ratings using people meter since 1992, but was only limited to Seoul Capital Area. In 1998, TNS Media Korea began as a rival company in partnership with Taylor Nelson Sofres (TNS) which extended the service to five major cities; it was officially launched in June 1999 with a more sophisticated viewership rating survey technique. While, in August 1999, AC Nielsen acquired MSK and rebranded it as AC Nielsen Korea and expanded the audience rating survey to the whole country with the aim to increase the credibility of the ratings. In 2005, AC Nielsen Korea signed a merger with AGB Group and AGB Nielsen Media Research was established. AGB Nielsen Media Research merged with KADD Nielsen Media Research in January 2013, and the official name was changed to Nielsen Korea.

In 2010, TNS Media Korea was renamed to TNmS (Total National Multimedia Statistics). Since late 2018, TNmS stopped providing data to the public through their websites, and instead occasionally releases the ratings through news agencies such as BreakNews.

List of highest-rated series on terrestrial television 

The list was compiled from data by Nielsen Korea, based on the episode of the highest viewership since 1992.

By household rating 
 By viewers

List of highest-rated series on cable television

By household rating 
 By viewers

See also 

 Chinese television drama
 List of South Korean television series
 History of Korean animation
 Japanese television drama
 Manhwa
 Mass media in South Korea
 Taiwanese television drama
 Television in South Korea
 Webtoon

Footnotes

References

Bibliography 
 
 
 
 
 
 
 
 
 
 
 
 
 
 
 
 
 
 
 
 

Asian drama
Television drama